The Liberal Catholic Church International (LCCI) is a Christian denomination with headquarters in Casa Grande, Arizona, USA.

External links
 Liberal Catholic Church International - Diocese of Arizona & California
 Liberal Catholic Church International - Province of Great Britain

Independent Catholic denominations
Christian organizations established in 1916
Christian denominations established in the 20th century